Aggi Ramudu is a 1954 Telugu-language swashbuckler film, produced and directed by S. M. Sriramulu Naidu. It stars N. T. Rama Rao and Bhanumathi Ramakrishna, with music composed by S M Subbayya Naidu. The film was simultaneously shot in Tamil as Malaikkallan (1954).

Plot 
The film begins with a Zamindar, Somanatham (D. Balasubrahmanyam), who lives with his daughter Sarada (Bhanumathi Ramakrishna) and his sister Kamakshamma (Rushyendramani), whose son Kumar went missing when he was 10 years old. Somanatham's wayward nephew Veerraju (Sriram) plans to marry Sarada and sends his henchman Kaaturi Kalayya (R. Nageswara Rao) to kidnap her. Aggi Ramudu (N. T. Rama Rao) saves her and takes her to his abode in the forest. The police Sub-Inspector (Mukkamala) and his head constable Venkata Swamy (Relangi) are on the hunt for Aggi Ramudu as he is charged with the atrocities which are the handiwork of Kalayya and his men supported by Veerraju and the Mangalampadu Zamindar (Mahankali Venkayya). Sarada realizes that Aggi Ramudu is a do-gooder to society and not a criminal. She falls in love with him. As promised, Aggi Ramudu sends her home through her neighbor Abdul Rahim. On hearing that her father is held captive by Veerraju, Sarada rushes to his house. At the same time, Abdul Rahim arrives with the police. After a fight, the culprits are taken into custody. A hilarious drama follows before it is revealed that Aggi Ramudu, Abdul Rahim, and Kumar are the same.

Cast 
N. T. Rama Rao as Aggi Ramudu / Abdul Rehman / Kumar
Bhanumathi Ramakrishna as Sharada
Relangi as Head Constable 441
R. Nageswara Rao as Kaaturi Kaalayya
Mukkamala as Sub Inspector
Mahankali Venkayya as Zamindar
Sriram as Veerraju
D. Balasubrahmanyam as Somanatham
Rushyendramani as Kamakshamma
Surabhi Balasaraswathi as Janaki
Sandhya as Parvathi

Soundtrack 

Music was composed by S. M. Subbaiah Naidu. Lyrics were written by Acharya Aatreya. Music released by Audio Company.

References

External links 
 

1950s Telugu-language films
Films scored by S. M. Subbaiah Naidu
Indian black-and-white films
Indian swashbuckler films
Robin Hood films
Telugu remakes of Tamil films
Films directed by S. M. Sriramulu Naidu